Battalion 609 is a 2019 Indian action film written and directed by Brijesh Batuknath Tripathi and produced by  Naraindas Lalwani under his banner N.J Lalwani Films and Executive Producer Shree Rammy Pandey. Starring Shoaib Ibrahim, Elena Kazan, Farnaz Shetty, Sparsh Sharma, Vishwas Kini, Kiaan, Jashn Kohli, Vicky Ahuja, Vikas Srivastava, Chandraprakash Thakur, Manish R. Sharma & Shree Rammy Pandey. It was all India theatrically released on 11 January 2019.

Plot
The story revolves around a friendly cricket match between the Indian Army and the Pakistan Army gone wrong and narrates the tale of the soldiers of Battalion 609 putting up a fight with Taliban. After an attack on the Indian army near the LOC, the match which was to be played between India and Pakistan is cancelled. Anwar Hussein, a Pakistani soldier who is very fond of cricket and was looking forward to the match, throws a cricket bat at the other end of the LOC and calls the Indian army and Indians a bunch of cowards. In anger, the Indian army throws a ball towards them. Soon, a verbal fight breaks between them which leads to the two teams deciding to play a cricket match. The losing team will take their post eighteen kilometres back.

Cast

Shoaib Ibrahim as Kamraj Mishra
 Rima Mishra as Rima 
 Sunil Gupta as Sunil
Elena Kazan as Rukhsana
Farnaz Shetty as Bijli
Ram Awana as Maqsood
Vishwas Kini as Iqbal Qureshi
Jashan Singh Kohli as Balbeer Singh
Chandraprakash Thakur as General Yashwant
Sparsh Sharma as Jassi(Jaspal Singh)
Major Kishore as Kanan Gopal Rao
Manish Sharma as Shoaib Jamal
Vikas Srivastava as Al-Nazar
Vicky Ahuja
 Shrikant Kamat as Gulshan Pandey
Shree Rammy Pandey as Major Rammy

Music 

The film's soundtrack was composed and produced by Shailendra Sayanti and lyrics were written by Raj Sandilya, Sanjay Mahendra Pachori and Sanidhya Sawarna.  Sanjay Choudhuri worked as a guest composer. The first song, "Garam Hai Itnee Body", was sung by Raja Sagoo.

References

External links
 
 

2019 films
2010s Hindi-language films
2010s action war films
Indian action war films
Films set in 2016
Films about military personnel
Indian Army in films
Military of Pakistan in films
Films about cricket in India